Discoidin domain-containing receptor 2, also known as CD167b (cluster of differentiation 167b), is a protein that in humans is encoded by the DDR2 gene.  Discoidin domain-containing receptor 2 is a receptor tyrosine kinase (RTK).

Function 

RTKs play a key role in the communication of cells with their microenvironment. These molecules are involved in the regulation of cell growth, differentiation, and metabolism. In several cases the biochemical mechanism by which RTKs transduce signals across the membrane has been shown to be ligand induced receptor oligomerization and subsequent intracellular phosphorylation. In the case of DDR2, the ligand is collagen which binds to its extracellular discoidin domain. This autophosphorylation leads to phosphorylation of cytosolic targets as well as association with other molecules, which are involved in pleiotropic effects of signal transduction. DDR2 has been associated with a number of diseases including fibrosis and cancer.

Structure 

RTKs have a tripartite structure with extracellular, transmembrane, and cytoplasmic regions. This gene encodes a member of a novel subclass of RTKs and contains a distinct extracellular region encompassing a factor VIII-like domain.

Gene 

Alternative splicing in the 5' UTR of the DDR2 gene results in multiple transcript variants encoding the same protein.

Interactions 

DDR2 (gene) has been shown to interact with SHC1 and phosphorylate Shp2.  DDR2 also interacts with Integrin α1β1 and α2β1 by promoting their adhesion to collagen.

References

Further reading 

 
 
 
 
 
 
 
 
 
 
 
 
 
 
 
 
 
 
 

Clusters of differentiation
Tyrosine kinase receptors